Eric John Weinrich (born December 19, 1966) is an American former professional ice hockey defenseman who played 17 seasons in the National Hockey League (NHL) with the New Jersey Devils, Hartford Whalers, Chicago Blackhawks, Montreal Canadiens, Boston Bruins, Philadelphia Flyers, St. Louis Blues, and Vancouver Canucks. He played 1,157 career NHL games, scoring 70 goals and 318 assists for 388 points.

Amateur career
Eric Weinrich grew up in the small town of Gardiner, Maine, went to high school at North Yarmouth Academy in Yarmouth, Maine, and played his college hockey at the University of Maine, where he studied archaeology and anthropology. He played 83 games over three seasons at the University of Maine, and was named an NCAA East Second Team All-American for the 1986–87 season.  Weinrich would leave the team the next season to play for the United States national team.

Professional career
Weinrich was originally selected by the Buffalo Sabres in the 1984 NHL Entry Draft although the pick was deemed invalid as he had yet to clear the minimum age restriction for eligible draftees. Weinrich entered the draft the next year and was drafted 32nd overall by the New Jersey Devils in the 1985 NHL Entry Draft.  
Weinrich joined the Utica Devils, the AHL developmental affiliate team of his draft team, the New Jersey Devils for the 1988–89 and 1989–90 AHL seasons, winning the Eddie Shore Award in 1990.  He would also play 21 games for the NHL Devils during those years, scoring nine points.  He joined New Jersey full-time for the 1990–91 NHL season, having his best offensive year with 38 points and earning a spot on the NHL All-Rookie Team, but would be traded with Sean Burke to the Hartford Whalers for Bobby Holik and draft choices on 28 August 1992.

After spending just over a season with the Whalers, Weinrich was traded with Patrick Poulin to the Chicago Blackhawks for Steve Larmer and Bryan Marchment.  He would play for the Blackhawks for several seasons before being traded once again shortly into the 1998–99 NHL season, this time to the Montreal Canadiens.  Weinrich again would not last long with his new team, being traded yet again to the Boston Bruins for Patrick Traverse midway through the 2000–01 NHL season in what is believed to have been the first trade between the two teams since 1964.

Weinrich signed with the Philadelphia Flyers as a free agent on July 5, 2001 and played his 1000th game with them during the 2002–03 NHL season.  However, this was not enough to prevent him from being traded once again, this time to the St. Louis Blues, shortly after the 2004 NHL All-Star game.  During the 2004–05 NHL lockout, he played with VSV EC of the Austrian Hockey League, but returned to the Blues for the 2005–06 NHL season, during which he was traded for the final time, his last NHL team being the Vancouver Canucks.

Weinrich announced his retirement on August 4, 2006 after 17 seasons in the NHL.  Upon his retirement, he became an assistant coach for the Portland Pirates in the AHL, then on January 25, 2007 he signed a professional tryout contract with the team and began playing immediately. Weinrich skated with the Pirates for two seasons before hanging up the skates for good after the 2007-08 season.

Weinrich worked as a professional scout for the Buffalo Sabres for three years. He is currently a development coach for the New Jersey Devils.

Awards and honors

 AHL First All-Star Team (1990)
 Eddie Shore Award (1990)
 NHL All-Rookie Team (1991)

Career statistics

Regular season and playoffs

International

See also
List of NHL players with 1000 games played

References

External links
 

1966 births
American men's ice hockey defensemen
Boston Bruins players
Buffalo Sabres scouts
Chicago Blackhawks players
EC VSV players
Hartford Whalers players
Ice hockey people from Maine
Ice hockey people from Virginia
Ice hockey players at the 1988 Winter Olympics
Living people
Maine Black Bears men's ice hockey players
Montreal Canadiens players
New Jersey Devils draft picks
New Jersey Devils players
Olympic ice hockey players of the United States
People from Gardiner, Maine
Sportspeople from Roanoke, Virginia
Philadelphia Flyers players
Portland Pirates players
St. Louis Blues players
Utica Devils players
Vancouver Canucks players
North Yarmouth Academy alumni
AHCA Division I men's ice hockey All-Americans